All Access Europe is a video album released by American rapper Eminem in 2002. The album contains segments of Eminem's live performances during a European tour intended to promote The Marshall Mathers LP. The album includes live guest appearances by "Stan" featuring Dido, "The Way I Am" featuring Marilyn Manson, and "Bitch Please II" featuring Xzibit, special features "Purple Pills" with D12 and "Forgot About Dre" with Dr. Dre.

The album peaked at number on the Billboard's Music Video Sales chart and was certified Platinum by the Recording Industry Association of America and British Phonographic Industry.

Track listing

Charts

Certifications

References

External links

2002 live albums
2002 video albums
Live video albums
Eminem video albums
Interscope Records live albums
Interscope Records video albums